Scott Powell Holroyd (born June 5, 1975) is an American actor.

Biography

Early life and education
Holroyd was born and raised in Columbia, South Carolina. He graduated from the University of South Carolina in 1998, receiving a B.A. in Mass Communications and Journalism.

In September 1999, he moved to New York City to study at the School for Film and Television in Manhattan.

Career
Holroyd received a small role in the film The Program (for which he was uncredited) and made a guest appearance on the television show Matlock, playing a teenager (both in 1993).

On July 10, 2001, he was cast in the role of Paul Ryan in the CBS daytime soap opera As the World Turns; he was the fifth actor to play the role of Paul Ryan. On May 13, 2003, he made his last appearance on ATWT. He left the show to pursue other acting opportunities and was replaced by soap opera actor Roger Howarth.

He relocated to Los Angeles in 2004 and has made guest appearances on numerous television shows, including Law & Order: Special Victims Unit, That '70s Show, In Justice, Without a Trace, and Ghost Whisperer. He was also featured in the second season of Dirty Sexy Money as Patrick Darling's brother-in-law Chase Alexander. In 2009 he played Quinn's husband David Fletcher on the seventh season  of One Tree Hill, and in 2010, villain spy Justin Sullivan on the third season of Chuck.

Personal life
Holroyd began dating his childhood friend, actress Allison Munn, in 2004. They became engaged in December 2006 in Paris and married on November 17, 2007 at the French Huguenot Church in Charleston, South Carolina. They reside in Los Angeles with their pet terrier, Buster Keaton. In November 2011, Munn and Holroyd had a son.

References

External links

1975 births
American male film actors
American male television actors
Living people
Male actors from South Carolina
University of South Carolina alumni
20th-century American male actors
21st-century American male actors